The George Louis Beer Prize is an award given by the American Historical Association for the best book in European international history from 1895 to the present written by a United States citizen or permanent resident. The prize was created in 1923 to honor the memory of George Beer, a prominent historian, member of the U.S. delegation at the 1919 Paris Peace Conference, and senior League of Nations official. Described by Jeffrey Herf, the 1998 laureate, as "the Academy Award" of book prizes for modern European historians, it is one of the most prestigious American prizes for book-length history. The Beer Prize is usually awarded to senior scholars in the profession; the American Historical Association restricts its other distinguished European history award, the Herbert Baxter Adams Prize, to young authors publishing their first substantial work.

Only four historians—Edward W. Bennett, Carole Fink, Piotr S. Wandycz, and Gerhard Weinberg—have won the Beer Prize more than once.

List of prizewinners 
Source:

2022 — Emily Greble, Muslims and the Making of Modern Europe 
2021 — Francine Hirsch, Soviet Judgment at Nuremberg: A New History of the International Military Tribunal after World War II 
2020 — Emma Kuby, Political Survivors: The Resistance, the Cold War, and the Fight against Concentration Camps after 1945 
2019 — Quinn E. Slobodian, Globalists: The End of Empire and the Birth of Neoliberalism 
2018 — Corey Ross, Ecology and Power in the Age of Empire: Europe and the Transformation of the Tropical World
2017 — Erik Linstrum, Ruling Minds: Psychology in the British Empire
2016 — Vanessa Ogle, The Global Transformation of Time: 1870-1950 
2015 — Frederick Cooper, Citizenship between Empire and Nation: Remaking France and French Africa, 1945-60 
2014 — Mary Louise Roberts, What Soldiers Do: Sex and the American GI in World War II France 
2013 — R.M. Douglas, Orderly and Humane: The Expulsion of the Germans after the Second World War
2012 — Tara Zahra, The Lost Children: Reconstructing Europe's Families after World War II
2011 — David M. Ciarlo, Advertising Empire: Race and Visual Culture in Imperial Germany
2011 — Michael A. Reynolds, Shattering Empires: The Clash and Collapse of the Ottoman and Russian Empires, 1908-18
2010 — Holly Case, Between States: The Transylvanian Question and the European Idea during World War II
2009 — William I. Hitchcock, The Bitter Road to Freedom: A New History of the Liberation of Europe
2008 — Melvyn P. Leffler, For the Soul of Mankind: The United States, the Soviet Union, and the Cold War
2007 — J.P. Daughton, An Empire Divided: Religion, Republicanism, and the Making of French Colonialism, 1880-1914
2006 — Mark A. Lawrence, Assuming the Burden: Europe and the American Commitment to War in Vietnam
2005 — Carole Fink, Defending the Rights of Others: The Great Powers, the Jews, and International Minority Protection, 1878-1938
2004 — Kate Brown, A Biography of No Place: From Ethnic Borderland to Soviet Heartland
2003 — Timothy D. Snyder, The Reconstruction of Nations: Poland, Ukraine, Lithuania, Belarus, 1569-1999
2002 — Matthew Connelly, A Diplomatic Revolution: Algeria's Fight for Independence and the Origins of the Post-Cold War Era
2001 — John Connelly, Captive University: The Sovietization of East German, Czech, and Polish Higher Education, 1945-56
2000 — Marc Trachtenberg, A Constructed Peace: The Making of the European Settlement, 1945-63
1999 — Daniel T. Rodgers, Atlantic Crossings: Social Politics in a Progressive Age
1998 — Jeffrey Herf, Divided Memory: The Nazi Past in the Two Germanys
1997 — Vojtech Mastny, The Cold War and Soviet Insecurity: The Stalin Years
1995 — Mary Nolan, Visions of Modernity: American Business and the Modernization of Germany
1994 — Gerhard L. Weinberg, A World at Arms: A Global History of World War II
1993 — Christine A. White, British and American Commercial Relations with Soviet Russia, 1918-24
1992 — Nicole T. Jordan, The Popular Front and Central Europe: The Dilemmas of French Impotence, 1918-40
1991 — John R. Gillingham, Coal, Steel, and the Rebirth of Europe, 1945-55 
1990 — Steven M. Miner, Between Churchill and Stalin. The Soviet Union, Great Britain, and the Origins of the Grand Alliance
1989 — Piotr S. Wandycz, The Twilight of the French Eastern Alliances, 1926-36: French-Czechoslovak-Polish Relations from Locarno to the Remilitarization of the Rhineland
1988 — Michael J. Hogan, The Marshall Plan: America, Great Britain, and the Reconstruction of Western Europe, 1947-52 
1987 — Philip S. Khoury, Syria and the French Mandate: The Politics of Arab Nationalism 
1985 — Carole Fink, The Genoa Conference: European Diplomacy, 1921-22
1984 — Wm. Roger Louis, The British Empire in the Middle East, 1945-51: Arab Nationalism, the United States, and Postwar Imperialism
1983 — Sarah M. Terry, Poland's Place in Europe: General Sikorski and the Origin of the Oder-Neisse Line, 1939-43
1982 — MacGregor Knox, Mussolini Unleashed, 1939-41: Politics and Strategy in Fascist Italy's Last War
1981 — Sally J. Marks, Innocent Abroad: Belgium at the Paris Peace Conference of 1919
1979 — Edward W. Bennett, German Disarmament and the West, 1932-33
1977 — Stephen A. Schuker, The End of French Predominance in Europe: The Financial Crisis of 1924 and the Adoption of the Dawes Plan
1976 — Charles S. Maier, Recasting Bourgeois Europe: Stabilization in France, Germany and Italy in the Decade After World War I
1972 — Jon S. Jacobson, Locarno Diplomacy: Germany and the West
1971 — Gerhard L. Weinberg, The Foreign Policy of Hitler’s Germany, Diplomatic Revolution in Europe, 1933-36
1970 — Samuel R. Williamson, Jr., The Politics of Grand Strategy: Britain and France Prepare for War, 1904-14
1969 — Richard Ullman, Britain and the Russian Civil War, November 1918-February 1920 
1967 — George A. Brinkley, The Volunteer Army and the Revolution in South Russia
1966 — Robert Wohl, French Communism in the Making
1965 — Paul S. Guinn, British Strategy and Politics, 1914-18
1964 — Ivo Lederer, Yugoslavia at the Paris Peace Conference
1964 — Harold Nelson, Land and Power: British and Allied Policy on Germany’s Frontiers, 1916-19
1963 — Edward W. Bennett, Germany and the Diplomacy of the Financial Crisis, 1931
1963 — Hans A. Schmitt, The Path to European Union
1962 — Piotr S. Wandycz, France and Her Eastern Allies, 1919-25
1961 — Charles F. Delzell, Mussolini's Enemies: The Italian Anti-Fascist Resistance
1960 — Rudolph Binion, Defeated Leaders: The Political Fate of Cailleux, Jouvenel, and Tardieu
1959 — Ernest R. May, The World War and American Isolation 1914-17
1958 — Victor S. Mamatey, The United States and East Central Europe
1957 — Alexander Dallin, German Rule in Russia, 1941-45 
1956 — Henry Cord Meyer, Mitteleuropa in German Thought and Action, 1815-1945
1955 — Richard Pipes, The Formation of the Soviet Union
1954 — Wayne Vucinich, Serbia Between East and West: The Events of 1903-08
1953 — Russell H. Fifield, Woodrow Wilson and the Far East
1952 — Robert H. Ferrell, Peace in Their Time: The Origins of the Kellogg-Briand Pact
1943 — Arthur Norton Cook, British Enterprise in Nigeria
1941 — Arthur Marder, The Anatomy of British Sea Power
1940 — Richard H. Heindel, The American Impact on Great Britain, 1898-1914
1939 — Pauline R. Anderson, Background of Anti-English Feeling in Germany, 1890-1902
1938 — René Albrecht-Carrié, Italy at the Paris Peace Conference
1937 — Charles Porter, The Career of Théophile Delcassé
1934 — Ross Hoffman, Great Britain and the German Trade Rivalry, 1875-1914
1933 — Robert T. Pollard, China's Foreign Relations, 1917-31
1932 — Oswald H. Wedel, Austro-German Diplomatic Relations, 1908-14 
1931 — Oron J. Hale, Germany and the Diplomatic Revolution: A Study in Diplomacy and the Press, 1904-06
1930 — Bernadotte E. Schmitt, The Coming of the War, 1914
1929 — M.B. Giffen, Fashoda: The Incident and Its Diplomatic Setting
1928 — Sidney Bradshaw Fay, The Origins of the World War
1925 — Edith Stickney, Southern Albania or Northern Epirus in European International Affairs, 1912-23
1924 — Alfred L.P. Dennis, The Foreign Policies of Soviet Russia
1923 — Walter Russell Batsell, The Mandatory System: Its Historical Background and Relation to the New Imperialism
1923 — Edward Mead Earle, Turkey, the Great Powers, and the Bagdad Railway

See also
List of history awards
Prizes named after people

References

External links 
 List of George Louis Beer Prize winners

American Historical Association book prizes
American history awards
American non-fiction literary awards
Awards established in 1923
1923 establishments in the United States